Labdia promacha is a moth of the family Cosmopterigidae. It is found in Taiwan and Australia.

References

Moths described in 1897
Labdia